Dervish Mehmed Pasha may refer to:

 Boşnak Dervish Mehmed Pasha, who held office under Ahmed I (1606)
 Koca Dervish Mehmed Pasha, who held office under Mehmed IV (1653–54) 
 Moralı Dervish Mehmed Pasha, who held office under Abdülhamid I (1775–77)  on List of Ottoman Grand Viziers
 Burdurlu Dervish Mehmed Pasha, who held office under Mahmud II (1818–20), see List of Ottoman Grand Viziers

Others
 Dervish Mehmed Zilli, the real name of the 17th-century Turkish traveler Evliya Çelebi

See also
 Mehmed Pasha (disambiguation)
 Derviş
 Dervish (disambiguation)